The 2013 WTA Tour was the elite professional tennis circuit organized by the Women's Tennis Association (WTA) for the 2013 tennis season. The 2013 WTA Tour calendar comprised the Grand Slam tournaments (supervised by the International Tennis Federation, the WTA Premier tournaments (Premier Mandatory, Premier 5, and regular Premier), the WTA International tournaments, the Fed Cup (organized by the ITF), and the year-end championships (the WTA Tour Championships and the WTA Tournament of Champions). Also included in the 2013 calendar is the Hopman Cup, which was organized by the ITF and does not distribute ranking points.

Schedule
This was the complete schedule of events on the 2013 calendar, with player progression documented from the quarterfinals stage.
Key

January

February

March

April

May

June

Jul

August

September

Oct

Statistical information

These tables present the number of singles (S), doubles (D), and mixed doubles (X) titles won by each player and each nation during the season, within all the tournament categories of the 2013 WTA Tour: the Grand Slam tournaments, the year-end championships (the WTA Tour Championships and the Tournament of Champions), the WTA Premier tournaments (Premier Mandatory, Premier 5, and regular Premier), and the WTA International tournaments. The players/nations are sorted by: 1) total number of titles (a doubles title won by two players representing the same nation counts as only one win for the nation); 2) cumulated importance of those titles (one Grand Slam win equalling two Premier Mandatory/Premier 5 wins, one year-end championships win equalling one-and-a-half Premier Mandatory/Premier 5 win, one Premier Mandatory/Premier 5 win equalling two Premier wins, one Premier win equalling two International wins); 3) a singles > doubles > mixed doubles hierarchy; 4) alphabetical order (by family names for players).

Key

Titles won by player

Titles won by nation

Titles information
The following players won their first main circuit title in singles, doubles, or mixed doubles:
Singles
 Marina Erakovic – Memphis (draw)
 Simona Halep – Nürnberg (draw)
 Yvonne Meusburger – Bad Gastein (draw)
 Monica Niculescu – Florianópolis (draw)
 Elina Svitolina – Baku (draw)
 Karolína Plíšková – Kuala Lumpur (draw)
 Elena Vesnina – Hobart (draw)
 Zhang Shuai - Guangzhou (draw)
Doubles
 Lara Arruabarrena – Katowice (draw)
 Mona Barthel – Stuttgart (draw)
 Ashleigh Barty – Birmingham (draw)
 Chan Chin-wei – Seoul (draw)
 Casey Dellacqua – Pattaya (draw)
 Chan Hao-ching – Shenzhen (draw)
 Oksana Kalashnikova – Baku (draw)
 Sandra Klemenschits – Bad Gastein (draw)
 Andreja Klepač – Bad Gastein (draw)
 Mandy Minella – Bogotá (draw)
 Garbiñe Muguruza – Hobart (draw)
 Katarzyna Piter – Palermo (draw)
 Karolína Plíšková – Linz (draw)
 Kristýna Plíšková – Linz (draw)
 María Teresa Torró Flor – Hobart (draw)
 Stephanie Vogt – Luxembourg (draw)
 Yanina Wickmayer – Luxembourg (draw)
 Xu Yifan – Seoul (draw)
Mixed doubles
 Jarmila Gajdošová – Australian Open (draw)
 Andrea Hlaváčková – US Open (draw)
 Lucie Hradecká – French Open (draw)
 Kristina Mladenovic – Wimbledon (draw)

The following players defended a main circuit title in singles, doubles, or mixed doubles:
Singles
 Victoria Azarenka – Australian Open (draw), Doha (draw)
 Sara Errani – Acapulco (draw)
 Magdaléna Rybáriková – Washington, D.C. (draw)
 Maria Sharapova – Stuttgart (draw)
 Serena Williams – Charleston (draw), Madrid (draw), US Open (draw), 2013 WTA Tour Championships (draw)
Doubles
 Shuko Aoyama – Washington (draw)
 Irina Buryachok – Baku (draw)
 Chang Kai-chen – Kuala Lumpur (draw)
 Raquel Kops-Jones – Carlsbad (draw)
 Nadia Petrova – Miami (draw)
 Lucie Šafářová – Charleston (draw)
 Abigail Spears – Carlsbad (draw)
 Katarina Srebotnik – Sydney (draw)

Rankings
The Race to the Championships determines the players in the WTA Tour Championships in October. The WTA rankings are based on tournaments of the latest 52 weeks.

Singles
The following is the 2013 top 20 ranked players in the world and top 20 in the Race to the Championships. Players must include points from the Grand Slams, Premier Mandatory tournaments and the WTA Championships. For Top 20 players, their best two results at Premier 5 tournaments will also count. Gold backgrounds indicate players that qualified for the WTA Tour Championships. Blue backgrounds indicate players that qualified as alternates at the WTA Tour Championships.

Number 1 ranking

Doubles
The following is 2013 season's top 20 doubles players ranked individually, followed by a list of the top 10 doubles pair in the Race to the Championships. Gold backgrounds indicate teams that have qualified for WTA Tour Championships.

Number 1 ranking

Prize money leaders

Statistics leaders

Points distribution

Retirements
Following is a list of notable players (winners of a main tour title, and/or part of the WTA rankings top 100 (singles) or (doubles) for at least one week) who announced their retirement from professional tennis, became inactive (after not playing for more than 52 weeks), or were permanently banned from playing, during the 2013 season:

  Elena Baltacha (born 14 August 1983 in Kyiv, Ukrainian SSR, Soviet Union) turned professional in 1997, reaching a career high ranking of world #49 in September 2010. Throughout her career, Baltacha frequently ranked as the British #1, most recently in 2012, and competed at the London Olympic Games in 2012, where she reached the second round in singles and the first round in doubles with Anne Keothavong. Baltacha won no titles on the WTA Tour (singles or doubles) but won 11 singles and 4 doubles titles on the ITF tour, including two $100,000 tournaments in Midland, USA and Nottingham, United Kingdom. Baltacha reached the third round of a Grand Slam tournament on three occasions, at the Australian Open in 2005 and 2010, and at Wimbledon in 2002. She also scored two wins over top ten players – Francesca Schiavone and Li Na, both in 2010. Baltacha announced her retirement in November 2013 after the completion of her 2013 season (she did subsequently die from cancer in May of the following year).
 Marion Bartoli (born 2 October 1984 in Le Puy-en-Velay, France) turned professional in February 2000 and was a consistent presence in and around the top twenty for most of her career, peaking at world #7 in January 2012. Bartoli was a two time participant at the Year End Championships (in 2007 and 2011) and won eight WTA singles titles during her career, with her final title being her most prestigious, at Wimbledon in 2013, where she defeated Sabine Lisicki to claim her only grand slam singles title. In addition, Bartoli reached the final of the 2007 Wimbledon Championships where she lost to Venus Williams, and also reached the quarter-finals or better at each of the other three majors. In addition to her singles success, Bartoli won three WTA doubles titles and reached a career high doubles ranking of #14 in 2004. Bartoli announced her retirement in August 2013 after losing to Simona Halep in the 2013 Western & Southern Open. She was ranked at a career-best matching world #7 at the time. Her retirement came just six weeks after she had claimed her Wimbledon title and was considered a big surprise as Bartoli had committed to several tournaments on the US Open Series swing and had previously shown no signs of wanting to leave the game.
 Yayuk Basuki (born 30 November 1970, in Yogyakarta, Indonesia), turned professional in 1990 career high ranking of 19 in singles and 9 in doubles. Her best singles performance at a Grand Slam event came at Wimbledon in 1997, where she reached the quarter-finals. Her best result in doubles competition at a Grand Slam event was in the 1993 US Open, where she and partner Nana Miyagi reached the semifinals. In the mixed doubles, Basuki reached the quarterfinals at the French Open in 1995 with Kenny Thorne as her partner. In 1997, she reached the same stage at Wimbledon, this time paired with Tom Nijssen. Her retirement in 2013 at the age of 42.
 Séverine Beltrame (born 14 August 1979 in Montpellier, France), sometimes known as Séverine Brémond, Beltrame turned professional in 2002, reaching a career high singles ranking of number 34 in February 2007. Beltrame won no titles on the WTA tour, but as a qualifier, reached the quarterfinals at Wimbledon in 2006, as well as the fourth round at the US Open in 2008. Beltrame was also known as a member of the notorious "Generation 1979" along with other French players including Amélie Mauresmo, Nathalie Dechy and Émilie Loit, and at the age of 33, was the last of the group to announce her retirement, playing her final match at the 2013 French Open, where she lost in the qualifying rounds.
 Anna Chakvetadze (born 5 March 1987 in Moscow, Russia) turned professional in 2003 and retired in September 2013 after lengthy health and injury problems. Chakvetadze won eight titles on the WTA tour during her career, including the Tier I Kremlin Cup in 2006. Other career highlights include reaching the semifinals of the 2007 US Open, which allowed to her achieve her career high ranking of world #5 immediately after the tournament. In addition, she reached the quarterfinals at the 2007 Australian Open and the 2007 French Open, results which helped her to qualify for the 2007 WTA Tour Championships in Madrid, where she qualified for the semifinals, before losing to Maria Sharapova. Chakvetadze's results began to decline following 2007, after she was the victim of an armed robbery, though she remained a steady presence in the top 50. Chakvetadze fell out of the top 100 in 2011 after suffering numerous injuries and a recurring condition that saw her faint on court numerous times. She attempted a comeback throughout 2012 but was again set back by injuries, and eventually announced her retirement on September 11, 2013.
 Jill Craybas (born 4 July 1974 in Providence, United States) turned professional in 1996. Enjoying a lengthy career, Craybas reached career high rankings of 39 in singles and 41 in doubles. Craybas competed at 45 consecutive grand slam main draws in singles between 2000 and 2011, with her best performance being at Wimbledon in 2005, where she upset Marion Bartoli and Serena Williams to make the fourth round. Craybas won one singles title on the WTA Tour at the Japan Open Tennis Championships in 2002, as well as winning five doubles titles. She announced her retirement after the US Open in 2013 at the age of 39.
 Galina Fokina (born January 17, 1984, in Moscow, Russia), turned professional in 1999.reaching a career high singles ranking of number 168 in May 2002 and the doubles no. 79 ranking in April 2002. She retired from professional tennis in 2013, aged 29.
 Carly Gullickson (born 26 November 1986 in Cincinnati, United States),turned professional in 2003.Her career-high WTA singles ranking is No. 123, which she reached in July 2009. Her career high doubles ranking is No. 52, set at April 2006. She won the 2009 U.S. Open mixed doubles event, partnering with Travis Parrott.She retired from professional tennis in 2013, aged 27. 
 Anne Keothavong (born 16 September 1983 in Hackney, United Kingdom), turned pro in 2001, reaching her career high singles ranking of number 48 in February 2009, as well as a career high doubles rank of 94 in 2011. She is a winner of 20 ITF singles titles and 8 ITF doubles titles, she also reached one WTA doubles final in 2013. Her career best performance at a slam was the third round at the US Open in 2008. She was also a part of Team GB during their home games at London 2012. She also played in the Great Britain Fed Cup team from 2001 to 2013. She announced her retirement on July 24, 2013, aged 29.
 Zuzana Kučová (born  26 June 1982 in Bratislava, SVK), turned pro in 2000. In June 2010, she reached her best singles ranking of world number 101. In December 2009, she peaked at world number 175 in the doubles rankings.2013 French Open. There, she caused a huge upset by defeating 24th seed Julia Görges in straight sets. in the second round lost to Virginie Razzano in three sets. His last professional tournament at 2013 French Open.
 Darya Kustova (born May 29, 1986, in Minsk, Belarus), turned pro in 2000. Her highest WTA singles ranking is 117, which she reached in January 2010. Her career high in doubles was 66, set in July 2008. She retired from professional tennis in 2013, aged 27.
 Nuria Llagostera Vives (born 16 May 1980 in Majorca, Spain), turned pro in 1996, reaching her career high singles ranking of number 35 in June 2005, as well as a career high doubles rank of 5 in 2009. She won 2 WTA singles titles and 16 doubles titles. Her career best performance at a slam was in doubles, reaching for three times the semifinals at the French Open in 2010 and 2012 and at the US Open in 2012. She won also the wta doubles championships final, partnering with María José Martínez Sánchez, defeating in the final Cara Black and Liezel Huber. She also played in the Spain Fed Cup team from 2005 to 2013, with 16 ties played. She announced her retirement on November 20, 2013, aged 33, due to a two-ban year suspension from tennis after testing positive for methamphetamine.
 Sophie Lefèvre (born 23 February 1981 in Toulouse, France), turned pro in 1998. In September 2003, she reached her highest WTA singles ranking of 216. Her highest doubles ranking was 76 reached in February 2011.She retired from professional tennis in 2013, aged 32.
 Tetiana Luzhanska (born September 4, 1984, in Kyiv, Ukraine),turned pro in 2006. Her highest WTA singles ranking is 131, which she reached in September 2011. Her career high doubles ranking is 99, set at February 2007. She retired from professional tennis in 2013, aged 29.
 Rebecca Marino (born 16 December 1990 in Toronto, Canada), joined the pro tour in 2008, reaching a career high singles ranking of number 38 in 2011. Marino made one WTA singles final (in Memphis) and won 5 ITF titles. Marino took an initial break from tennis in early 2012 citing personal reasons, returning late in the year. She announced her permanent retirement in February 2013, at the age of 22.
 Katalin Marosi (born 12 November 1979 in Gheorgheni, Romania), turned professional in October 1995, reaching a career high singles ranking of number 101 in May 2000 and the doubles no. 38 ranking in February 2013. Marosi lost all three WTA doubles finals she reached, but won 15 singles titles and 31 doubles titles on the ITF tour. She decided to retire after competing the 2013 WTA Tour.
 Zuzana Ondrášková (born 3 May 1980 in Opava, Czechoslovakia), turned professional in 1995, reaching a career high ranking of 74 in February 2004. Ondrášková won no titles on the WTA tour during her career, but won twenty titles on the ITF tour. Ondrášková progressed to the second round of Grand Slam events on four occasions and scored wins over several top players including Dinara Safina, Li Na and Marion Bartoli. Ondrášková announced her retirement from tennis in early 2013, aged 33.
 Marie-Ève Pelletier (born May 18, 1982, in Quebec City, Quebec, Canada),turned pro in 1998.She reached a career high ranking of 106 in singles in June 2005 and a career high of 54 in doubles in April 2010.She retired from professional tennis in 2013, aged 31.
 Ahsha Rolle (born 21 March 1985 in Miami Shores, Florida, United States), turned professional in 2004, reaching a career high singles ranking of number 82 in September 2007 and the doubles no. 111 ranking in October 2011. She entered the 2007 US Open as a wildcard entry. She defeated 17th seeded Tatiana Golovin in the first round and Karin Knapp in the second round. She fell to Dinara Safina in the third round. Due to some injuries, she retired from professional tennis in 2013, aged 28.
 Anastasija Sevastova (born 13 April 1990 in Liepāja, Latvia), turned professional in 2006, winning her first match on the WTA tour the following year. Sevastova reached a career high ranking of number 36 in January 2011, immediately following that years Australian Open, where she had achieved her best performance in a Grand Slam event, losing in the fourth round to world number one Caroline Wozniacki. Sevastova won one WTA Tour event in Estoril 2010, becoming the first Latvian woman to win a WTA singles title since 1993. Sevastova also scored two top 10 wins in her career, over Samantha Stosur and Jelena Janković. She announced her retirement in May 2013 at the age of 23, having endured frequent injuries since 2011.
 Melanie South (born 3 May 1986 in Kingston upon Thames, United Kingdom), turned professional in 2004. South reached a career high ranking of number 99 in February 2009 in singles and number 120 in March 2009 in doubles. South won no titles on the WTA tour during her career, but won six titles on the ITF tour. South progressed to the second round of Grand Slam events on one occasion and scored wins over several top players including Francesca Schiavone, Alicia Molik, Sybille Bammer and Petra Kvitová. South announced her retirement from tennis in December 2013, aged 27.
 Ágnes Szávay (born 29 December 1988 in Kiskunhalas, Hungary), joined the pro tour in 2004, reaching a career high singles ranking of number 13 in 2008. Szávay won 5 singles titles on the WTA tour, including the Tier 2 China Open in 2007, and in the same year, made the quarterfinal of the US Open. She also experienced success in doubles, reaching a career high rank of number 22 in 2007, winning two titles, and making it to the semifinal of the 2007 US Open with partner Vladimíra Uhlířová. Despite being named the WTA Newcomer of the Year in 2007, injuries limited Szávay's play beyond 2011, and she was ultimately forced into an early retirement in February 2013 at the age of 24.
 Romana Tedjakusuma (born 24 July  1976, in Jambi, Indonesia), turned professional in 1990, reaching a career high singles ranking of number 82 in April 1994 and the doubles no. 114 ranking in February 1995. She retired from professional tennis in 2013, aged 37.
 Aurélie Védy (born February 8, 1981, in France), turned professional in 1998, reaching a career high singles ranking of number 260. WTA doubles ranking is 85, set in May 2009.She retired from professional tennis in 2013, aged 32.
 Riza Zalameda (born February 10, 1986, in Los Angeles, United States), turned professional in 2002, reaching a career high singles ranking of number 534 July 2006 and the doubles no 76 April 2010. She retired from professional tennis in 2013, aged 27.

Comebacks
Following are notable players that came back after retirements during the 2013 WTA Tour season:
  Martina Hingis (born September 30, 1980, in Košice, Czechoslovakia), turned professional in 1994. She is a former world No. 1 in singles and doubles, is a 15-time Grand Slam champion (5 in singles, 9 in doubles and 1 in mixed) and holds 43 singles and 37 doubles titles. She returned to the doubles tour to play with Daniela Hantuchová in 2013.

Awards
The winners of the 2013 WTA Awards were announced throughout the last two weeks of November.

Player of the Year –  Serena Williams
Doubles Team of the Year –  Sara Errani &  Roberta Vinci
Most Improved Player –  Simona Halep
Comeback Player of the Year –  Alisa Kleybanova
Newcomer of the Year –  Eugenie Bouchard
Diamond Aces –  Victoria Azarenka
Fan Favorite Singles Player –  Agnieszka Radwańska
Fan Favorite Doubles Team –  Ekaterina Makarova &  Elena Vesnina
Fan Favorite Twitter –  Maria Sharapova
Fan Favorite Facebook –  Maria Sharapova
Fan Favorite Video – 40 LOVE Story Episode 10
Fan Favorite WTA Live Show – Cincinnati
Fan Favorite Shot of the Year –  Agnieszka Radwańska (Miami QF)
Fan Favorite Match of the Year –  Maria Sharapova Vs  Victoria Azarenka  (French Open SF)

See also

2013 WTA Awards 
2013 ATP World Tour
2013 ATP Challenger Tour
2013 WTA 125K series
2013 ITF Women's Circuit
2013 ITF Men's Circuit
Association of Tennis Professionals
International Tennis Federation

Notes

 After a flood in Hungary caused devastation in Budapest, the organizers decided to hold the tournament anyway, but cancelled the qualification draw (the first four top alternatives entering in the main draw automatically) and reducing the doubles draw from 16 teams to 8.

References

^ Jump up to: a b "Happy retirement Marie-Ève!". Tennis Canada. Retrieved 2013-01-12.

External links
Women's Tennis Association (WTA) official website
International Tennis Federation (ITF) official website
2013 WTA Tour schedule

 
WTA Tour
WTA Tour seasons